Lamjaotongba is a census town in Imphal West district in the Indian state of Manipur.

Demographics
 India census, Lamjaotongba had a population of 9067. Males constitute 48% of the population and females 52%. Lamjaotongba has an average literacy rate of 74%, higher than the national average of 59.5%: male literacy is 81%, and female literacy is 68%. In Lamjaotongba, 11% of the population is under 6 years of age.

References

Cities and towns in Imphal West district